Oliver Stonham is an English professional rugby union player, who currently plays as a flanker for Premiership Rugby side Saracens.

Early life 
Stonham attended Felsted School in Essex – the same school as future teammate and fellow Saracens academy graduate Max Malins – but did not play junior club rugby. He was a keen hockey player as a youngster and represented England at junior level, while rugby was his second sport. However, he gradually focused more on rugby, becoming the captain of his school's first team, before joining the Saracens academy.

Rugby career 
Stonham was recruited into the Saracens junior academy at the age of 16, and later graduated into the senior academy in June 2019. He made his Premiership debut in December that year, in a victory over Worcester. Subsequently, he featured in the Premiership Rugby Cup, whilst also spending time out on loan with Ampthill in the Championship. Prior to the 2022–23 season, Stonham was promoted into the Saracens first-team squad.

Stonham has represented England at age-group level. He featured for the England U18s in 2019. Two years later, he made three appearances for England U20s during their Grand Slam-winning campaign in the 2021 Six Nations.

References 

2000 births
Living people
English rugby union players
Rugby union flankers
Saracens F.C. players